Say Yes Enterprise is a 2004 Taiwanese romance television series directed by Doze Niu.

Cast (incomplete)
Doze Niu
Barbie Shu
Dee Shu
Hebe Tien
Vanness Wu
Wu Bai
Jack Kao
Lan Cheng-lung
Cecilia Yip
Lee Wei
Mike He
Lin Mei-hsiu

Awards and nominations

References

2004 Taiwanese television series debuts
2004 Taiwanese television series endings
Taiwan Television original programming
Mandarin-language television shows
Television shows filmed in Taiwan
Television shows set in Taiwan
Taiwanese romance television series
2000s anthology television series
Taiwanese anthology television series
Television series about marriage